Unreported World is a British foreign affairs program made by ITN Productions and broadcast by Channel 4 in the United Kingdom, first broadcast on 8 September 2000. Over the course of its forty-two series, reporters have travelled to dangerous locations all over the world in an attempt to uncover stories usually ignored by global media outlets. It is a critically acclaimed series on the lives of people in some of the fastest-changing areas of the world.

Episodes

Series 1 (2000) 
Series Producer: Eamonn Matthews

Series 2 (2001)
Series Producer: Eamonn Matthews

Series 3 (2002) 
Series Producer: Eamonn Matthews

Series 4 (2002) 
Series Producer: Eamonn Matthews
Note: may be incomplete

Series 5 (2003) 
Series Producer: Eamonn Matthews
Note: may be incomplete

Series 6 (2003)
Series Producer: Eamonn Matthews

Series 7 (2004)
Series Producer: Eamonn Matthews

Series 8 (2004)
Series Producer: Eamonn Matthews

Series 9 (2005)
Series Producer: Flora Gregory

Series 10 (2005)
Series Producer: Flora Gregory

Series 11 (2006)

Series 12 (2006)

Series 13 (2007)
Series Editor: Ed Braman

Series 14 (2007)

Series 15 (2008)

Series 16 (2008)

Series 17 (2009)

Series 18 (2009)

Series 19 (2010)

Series 20 (2010)

Series 21 (2011)

Series 22 (2011)

Series 23 (2012)

Series 24 (2012)

Series 25 (2013)

Series 26 (2013)

Series 27 (2014)

Series 28 (2014)

Series 29 (2015)

Series 30 (2015)

Series 31 (2016)

Series 32 (2016)

Series 33 (2017)

Series 34 (2017)

Series 35 (2018)

Series 36 (2018)

Series 37 (2019)

Series 38 (2019)

Series 39 (2020)

Series 40 (2021)

Series 41 (2021)

Series 42 (2022)

Series 43 (2022)

International
In the United States, the series aired on Fusion on 11 November 2015. For the US version, it was hosted by Dan Lieberman, Kimberly Brooks, and Mariana Atencio. The episodes were randomised and chosen from the more recent seasons.

References

Awards
 Award for the Global Defence of Human Rights Recipient, 2007 - International Service

External links
 
 
 
 Unreported World Podcast (2006)
 Unreported World - channel4.com  (2007)
 James Tomalin composed the music for Unreported World
 Unreported World episodes listing - BFI Film and TV Database (imperfect)

2000 British television series debuts
2000s British documentary television series
2010s British documentary television series
2020s British documentary television series
British television news shows
Channel 4 documentary series
Current affairs shows
English-language television shows
Investigative documentary television series